
Agassiz Glacier is a valley glacier in the Saint Elias Mountains in southern  Alaska (USA) and to a lesser extent on to Canadian territory.  

Glacier  was named by William Libbey, a member of the New York Times expedition in 1886, after Louis Agassiz (1807-1873), a Swiss-American naturalist.

Geography

The agglomeration of the Agassiz Glacier is located on the southern flank of Mount Malaspina north of the Canada–United States border.  The 25 km long glacier is fed by the Newton Glacier.  The three kilometres-wide glacier flows initially in a southwesterly direction, later in a south-easterly direction.  From the west, the Libbey Glacier meets the Agassiz Glacier.  This finally merges into the Malaspina Glacier, which finally flows into the Gulf of Alaska.

See also
 List of glaciers

References

External links

Glaciers of Alaska
Glaciers of Yakutat City and Borough, Alaska